Risa Shimizu may refer to:

, Japanese actress and voice actress
, Japanese football player